Dialidae, common name dialids, is a family of sea snails, marine gastropod molluscs in the clade Sorbeoconcha.

According to the taxonomy of the Gastropoda by Bouchet & Rocroi (2005), the family Dialidae has no subfamilies.

Genera 
Genus within the family Dialidae include:
 Diala A. Adams, 1861 - type genus of the family Dialidae, synonym: Laevitesta Laseron, 1950
 † Glosia Cossmann, 1921: extinct genus that belongs to the Neotaenioglossa 
 Mellitestea Laseron, 1956
 Paradiala Laseron, 1956
 † Rissoalaba Oyama, 1954

References